The Copa Movistar is a surfing competition, currently presented by Rip Curl and Samsung, a 2-Star World Qualification Series event held at the San Bartolo District in Lima, Peru. It is, according to Andina, a "rocky bottom beach break, allowing for both lefts and rights, depending on the conditions and prevailing swell direction".

Due to its rating and location, the event is primarily attended by the grind's South American contingent.

The event winner receives 500 WQS points as well as the most of the $25,000 purse.

2009 Event
Jan 23 - Jan 25
Winner: Rafael Pereira (VNZ)

References

Surfing competitions